Jan Peder Johansson, born 1958 in Ursviken, Skellefteå kommun, Västerbottens län. Swedish-born acoustic musician, composer, producer and pedagogue. Residing in Cary, North Carolina, and active in the United States since 1986.

His original music draws from several genres including traditional and contemporary Swedish, Bluegrass, Classical and Blues. He is the founder of Johansson's Acoustic Music Studio (JAMS) which provides music instruction in Bluegrass and other acoustic music. His formal education is the field of the Humanities and he received a Cand. Phil. degree in General Linguistics and Scandinavian languages from Umeå University, in Umeå, Sweden. He has done doctoral candidate studies at Stockholm's University and University of California at Los Angeles.
His interest for Bluegrass and old blues music started around 1972 shortly after receiving a Landola classical guitar from his grandparents over the Easter Holidays that year.  
Living in Northern Sweden made it difficult to find bluegrass records and the main source for recorded music was mail order companies like County Sales in Virginia.
Johansson recalls "The first album I ever bought was one by blues-man Bill Williams on the Blue Goose label. My second LP was Alabama Blues on Yazoo Records. I found both albums at the department store Tempo in Skellefteå."

Discography 
 1993 – Timeless (New Vintage Bluegrass Band)
 1995 – No Time for The Blues (New Vintage Bluegrass Band)
 1996 – Sands of Time (New Vintage Bluegrass Band)
 [..] – Requests from The Crowds (Roby Huffman)
 [..] – Pickin on Michael W Smith (Various Artists)
 [..] – Jeff Huffman (Jeff Huffman)
 [..] – Samantha Casey (Samantha Casey)
 [..] – Goodnight Gracies (Jan Johansson & Friends)
 [..] – Barbara Keller (Jan Johansson & Friends)
 1999 – Swedish Medley (Jan Johansson & Friends)
 1999 – Rambling (Jan Johansson & Friends)
 2003 – Mandolin Rose (Lorraine Jordan)
 2004 – Acoustic Sampler (Jan Johansson & Friends)
 2006 – Kindred (Jan Johansson & Friends)
 2009 – Smiling Faces (Jan Johansson & Friends)
 2012 – Nordic Impressions (Jan Johansson)
 2013 – Juxtaposed (Jan Johansson)
 2014 – Road to Happy Destiny (Jan Johansson)

Awards 
 2012 – In April 2012, Jan Johansson was inducted as a Kentucky colonel.
 1992–1997 – New Vintage Bluegrass Band charted several songs on Bluegrass Unlimited's Top 20 list.
 1994 – New Vintage was nominated for Emerging Artist of the Year by the International Bluegrass Music Association.
 1993 – New Vintage Bluegrass Band won top honors from the Society for the Preservation of Bluegrass Music in America (SPBGMA). 
 1993 – New Vintage Bluegrass Band won the Showdown Championship at the Pizza Hut International Bluegrass Finals.

Online Radio Show 
Jan Johansson is the host of the online radio show "The Old Numbers", a presentation of great artists in the bluegrass field who never received the attention they deserved.
He is also the producer of the bluegrass music history series Bluegrass Timeline which airs as a segment of Ray Ulan's show The Bluegrass Experiment on Raleigh Little Radio on Sundays 04:00 – 06:00 PM EST/16:00 – 18:00

Compositions 
 Lake Wheeler – The Waves
 Annyool
 Across The Dan River
 Kursk
 Hemlock Bluff
 Mochimune
 Facelift
 Bob & The Old Timers
 Violinismas
 Blankaholm
 Tarantulan Forest
 Contacts
 Salon 21
 Going Home
 Disjunctive Syllogism
 Well, I Declare
 A Minor Incident turned Major
 From The State of Kentucky
 The General's Store
 A Rag Old Time – a Joplinesque tribute to the Ragtime
 Circle of Friends
 Happy Birthday, Val
 Kursk
 Brenner Pass
 Private Eye – A Tribute to The Noir Film
 Trigger & Bigfoot
 West End
 The Skinner
 Valentine Skittles

References 
 Jan Johansson’s official website
 News & Observer ../../....

External links 
Jan Johansson & Friends on MySpace

– Bluegrass Timeline
– Lokalhistorisk Facebook grupp med fokus på Ursviken, en ort vid Västerbottenskusten.     In Swedish only.

1958 births
Swedish composers
Swedish male composers
Swedish bluegrass guitarists
Swedish bluegrass fiddlers
Male violinists
Swedish bluegrass mandolinists
People from Skellefteå Municipality
Swedish emigrants to the United States
Umeå University alumni
People from Cary, North Carolina
Guitarists from North Carolina
Living people
American male guitarists
20th-century American guitarists
21st-century American violinists
20th-century American male musicians
21st-century American male musicians